Black Cat, White Cat is a 1998 Serbian romantic black comedy film directed by Emir Kusturica. It won the Silver Lion for Best Direction at the Venice Film Festival.

The literal translation of the title is actually "Black pussycat, white tomcat". The movie characters speak in Romani, Serbian, and Bulgarian - frequently switching among them.

Plot
Matko Destanov, a small-time Romani smuggler and profiteer, lives with his teenage son Zare in a ramshackle house by the Danube River in eastern Serbia near the Bulgarian border.  He has plans to steal a whole train of smuggled fuel. To obtain a loan that would subsidize the heist, he visits Grga Pitić, a wheelchair-using old gangster, who is an old friend of Zarije Destanov, Matko's father and Zare's grandfather. Matko plots the details of the job with an ally named Dadan, a rich, fun-living, drug-snorting gangster who has a harem, juggles grenades, and cheats at gambling. However, Dadan double-crosses him and glitches up the deal by giving Matko a drink that is drugged, and carrying out the job while Matko is unconscious.  Matko is unable to repay his loan, so Dadan makes a deal whereby he would forgive the debt if Zare marries Afrodita, Dadan's dwarf sister. However, Zare (17) is in love with Ida (26), a barmaid who works in an establishment run by her Roma grandmother Sujka, and Afrodita is waiting for the man of her dreams. Dadan coerces Afrodita into marrying by dunking her in a well, while Zare first learns of the scheme to marry him off from Ida, who has overheard Dadan and Matko plotting it in the restaurant where she works. Meanwhile, Zare retrieves Zarije from the hospital where he is being kept, with the aid of a gypsy band. Grga Pitić is having problems of his own, as he wants his grandsons, including the 2.00m giant Grga Veliki, to get married.

The two reluctantly endure the wedding ceremony held at Matko's house, which Dadan refuses to postpone despite the sudden apparent death of Zarije. They were not supposed to have a wedding while in mourning, but Dadan decides to delay the death announcement, so Matko and Zare hide Zarije's body in the attic, packed in ice. Ida and Sujka provide the catering for the wedding, and Ida is upset at seeing her beloved married to someone else. However, the bride runs away mid-ceremony, pursued by Dadan, Matko and Dadan's criminal cronies. Meanwhile, Grga Veliki is driving his father and brother to Matko's house so that they may visit Zarije's grave (Grga Pitić and Zarije  old friends). The fleeing bride stumbles across Grga Veliki, and the couple fall instantly in love. Grga Pitić arrives on the scene, after his wheelchair had fallen out the back of the truck and rolled downhill, and he is delighted that Grga Veliki has found his mate. The old gangster forces Dadan, who had once worked for him, to accept the match.

The groom conspires with Sujka and Ida to bring Dadan down a peg, and rigs the outhouse so that the seat will come apart. While the preparations for the wedding ceremony of Afrodita and Grga Veliki are being conducted, Matko and Dadan pass the time by playing dice, with Dadan cheating. Sujka comes in during the game, and serves the unsuspecting Dadan a drink spiked with a laxative. Grga Pitić apparently dies, and Dadan and Matko hide his body in the attic, where Zarije's body is also hidden. However, the two corpses soon both come back to life; they were not dead after all. They are surprised to find themselves together, as they had not seen each other for 25 years and each had thought the other was dead. During the ceremony, Dadan starts to feel uncomfortable and rushes into the outhouse, only to fall into the manure. His harem and cronies desert him, and as he tries to clean himself off on a goose, only Matko remains loyal, and he provides Dadan with a shower from the garden hose. Zare grabs the wedding official at gunpoint and orders him to solemnize his marriage with his sweetheart, Ida, and the two sail off together on a riverboat set for Bulgaria with a fistful of cash stashed in his grandfather's accordion, the blessing of their respective grandparents and, as witnesses, a black cat and a white cat.

Cast
Bajram Severdžan as Matko Destanov
Srđan Todorović as Dadan Karambolo
Branka Katić as Ida
Florijan Ajdini as Zare Destanov
Ljubica Adžović as Sujka
Zabit Memedov as Zarije Destanov
Sabri Sulejmani as Grga Pitić
Jasar Destani as Grga Veliki
Salija Ibraimova as Afrodita
Stojan Sotirov as Bulgarian Customs Officer
Predrag Laković as Priest
Miki Manojlović as Priest

Production
In the aftermath of the worldwide success, as well as the controversy of his previous feature, Palme d'Or-winning Underground, Kusturica was so hurt by the aggressive criticism coming from several French intellectuals that he publicly announced his retirement from movies at the age of 41.

He later changed his mind, deciding to come back with a project on Gypsy music which he originally envisioned as a documentary with a working title Musika Akrobatika. The idea further evolved and Kusturica decided to add narrative flourishes of his own, so Musika Akrobatika got transformed into a fictional feature Black Cat, White Cat.

.

Reception

Black Cat, White Cat received a positive response from critics, garnering an 85% rating on Rotten Tomatoes based on 34 reviews with an average score of 7/10.

Janet Maslin of The New York Times wrote a positive review, summing the film up as "a mad scramble through the Felliniesque realm of Mr. Kusturica's imagination". She further praised Srdjan Todorovic's portrayal of Dadan Karambolo as "a repetitive but irresistible turn" before concluding that "Mr. Kusturica so evidently adores all of the film's other characters that Black Cat, White Cat becomes a wild, warts-and-all celebration of their lives and like Fellini, Kusturica finds true grace where it's least expected and makes films utterly, uncompromisingly his own".

In his review for the Los Angeles Times, Kevin Thomas refers to the film as a "raucous, knockabout comedy, a paean to love, freedom and friendship", before concluding that despite being two hours and nine minutes long, Black Cat, White Cat "gets away with it better than most over-long movies due to its beguiling rambling shaggy dog-story quality."

In a generally positive review, J. Hoberman of The Village Voice refers to the film as "bravura moviemaking by any objective standard" and a "vehicle for the director's lowdown magic-realist fantasies about Romany gangsters, which has a velocity that belies its jerry-built mise-en-scène" concluding that "Black Cat, White Cat is determined to twist every character into an ideogram for vulgar humanity" while wondering if "these gypsies are a screen on which the Bosnian-born director can project his own feelings of ostracism and homelessness".

Salon's Andrew O'Hehir wrote a positive review, describing the film as "manic, carnivalesque, and treating death as a minor (and temporary) inconvenience" and commends "Kusturica's convincing portrayal of his homeland as a social and architectural ruin, where everything is either falling apart or overbuilt in misbegotten grandiosity". O'Hehir concludes with "Kusturica strikes a half-ironic tone throughout this overcrowded, cacophonous masterpiece that’s almost impossible to categorize. In the tradition of Eastern European film, he’s satirizing the conventions of rural magic realism at least as much as he’s embracing them. But there’s nothing cynical or cold-hearted about Black Cat, White Cat. Like the waves of geese, pigs, goats, dogs and cats that sometimes threaten to overwhelm the human characters, it is recklessly, indescribably alive".

Peter Stack of the San Francisco Chronicle praised the film's characters who "whether freakish or treacherous, come up wonderfully human."

Web critic James Berardinelli praised the film as "something fresh and vibrant in an era when something as idiotic as Armageddon is the top-grossing movie of 1998 and films generally follow safe, comfortable patterns because that's what the studios' research shows that audiences want". He commended the film's "earthy feel as well as its charm that lies in it lacking the polished glaze of most big budget features although being expertly filmed", praised the performances of Bajram Severdzan and Branka Katic, and concluded that "while not a masterpiece, Kusturica's latest film is a real treat for those in search of a healthy dose of laughter set in a culture whose intricacies are rarely captured on film."

Soundtrack

Music has an important place in this picture, as it is present in almost every scene. Zarije is especially devoted to music as he's seen with the local band playing specially for him on the way from hospital and then at the fair near the lake.

Track listing
 "Bubamara Main Version" – 3:57
 "Duj Sandale" – 2:49
 "Railway Station" – 2:33
 "Jek di Tharin II" – 3:55
 "Daddy, Don't Ever Die on a Friday" – 3:18
 "Bubamara" – 2:36
 "Daddy's Gone" – 1:07
 "Long Vehicle" – 6:01
 "Pit Bull Mixed by Pink Evolution" – 3:40
 "El Bubamara Pasa" – 3:20
 "Ja Volim Te Jos/Meine Stadt" – 3:14
 "Bubamara Tree Stump" – 0:33
 "Jekdi Tharin" – 2:42
 "Lies" – 0:30
 "Hunting" – 1:01
 "Dejo Dance" – 1:01
 "Bulgarian Dance" – 1:25
 "Bubamara Sunflower" – 3:10
 "Black Cat, White Cat" – 8:52

Other songs from the film, not included in the original soundtrack album:

 "Where Do You Go" - Performed by No Mercy Club Mix version (Scene at Dadan's house)
 "Nowhere Fast" - Performed by Fire Inc. (Ida is seen dancing to music video of this song)
 "Money, Money, Money" (ABBA) - Covered by Dadan
 "Ne dolazi" - Covered by Matko
 "Dunaveki vali" - Performed by music box
 "Lubenica" - Covered by Dadan
 "Jek Ditharin" - Performed by Braca Lavaci
 "Von cerena todikano svato" - Performed by Ljubica Adzovic
 "An der schönen blauen Donau" - Performed by the Belgrade Philharmonic Orchestra

Personnel
Vojislav Aralica – guitar, keyboards
Šaban Bajramović – vocals
Rade Kosmajac – keyboards
Zoran Milošević – accordion
Bokan Stanković – trumpet

A few reprints of the soundtrack wrongly list Goran Bregovic as composer of the music.

Trivia
The vehicle driven by Zare Destanov (Florijan Ajdini) is a 1966 Renault Caravelle.

References

External links

 
 
 

1998 films
Films directed by Emir Kusturica
1998 romantic comedy films
Bulgarian-language films
Romani-language films
Serbian black comedy films
1990s Serbian-language films
Serbian musical films
Films set in Serbia
Serbian romantic comedy films
Films about Romani people
Films shot in Serbia
Crime in Serbia
Films about the Serbian Mafia
1998 multilingual films
Serbian multilingual films